Aktuel Naturvidenskab (lit.: Current Science) is a Danish language popular science magazine published in Aarhus, Denmark.

Profile
Aktuel Naturvidenskab is published by the Faculty of Science and Technology at the University of Aarhus in cooperation with Danish universities and institutions. It mostly provides news and in-depth articles on natural sciences, and it is one of the media partners of ScienceNordic.

In 2011, the magazine expanded its digital version, and now maintains an on-line digital archive of all published articles. The archive is public and free to use for non-commercial purposes.

See also
 List of magazines in Denmark

References

External links
 Official website for Aktuel Naturvidenskab

1999 establishments in Denmark
Aktuel
Bi-monthly magazines published in Denmark
Danish-language magazines
Magazines established in 1999
Magazines published in Denmark
Mass media in Aarhus
Popular science magazines